Avery is an unincorporated community in Three Oaks Township within Berrien County, in the U.S. state of Michigan.

History
A post office was established at Avery in 1860, and remained in operation until 1890. Gilbert B. Avery, the first postmaster and proprietor of a local sawmill, gave the community his last name.

References

Unincorporated communities in Berrien County, Michigan